This is a list of adult fiction books that topped The New York Times Fiction Best Seller list in 1974.

See also

 New York Times Nonfiction Best Sellers of 1974
 1974 in literature
 Lists of The New York Times Fiction Best Sellers
 Publishers Weekly list of bestselling novels in the United States in the 1970s

References

1974
.
1974 in the United States